The following highways are numbered 473:

Australia 

  Ventnor Road

Japan
 Japan National Route 473

United States
  Arizona State Route 473
  Louisiana Highway 473
  New Mexico State Road 473
  Puerto Rico Highway 473
 Texas:
  Texas State Highway Spur 473
  Ranch to Market Road 473